Dungeon Peak is a  mountain summit located on the shared border of Jasper National Park in Alberta, and Mount Robson Provincial Park in British Columbia, Canada. Dungeon Peak is part of The Ramparts in the Tonquin Valley. The descriptive name was applied in 1916 by Morrison P. Bridgland (1878-1948), a Dominion Land Surveyor who named many peaks in Jasper Park and the Canadian Rockies.  The mountain's name was made official in 1935 by the Geographical Names Board of Canada.


Climate
Based on the Köppen climate classification, Dungeon Peak is located in a subarctic climate zone with cold, snowy winters, and mild summers.

See also
List of peaks on the British Columbia–Alberta border
Tonquin Valley
The Ramparts

References

External links
 National Park Service web site: Jasper National Park
 Dungeon Peak weather: Mountain Forecast

Three-thousanders of Alberta
Three-thousanders of British Columbia
Canadian Rockies
Mount Robson Provincial Park